Donald Sandison Masson (born 26 August 1946) is a Scottish former footballer.

Club career
Masson began his career with Middlesbrough in 1964. He was signed by Notts County manager Billy Gray in 1968 in a joint deal for £7000 along with Bob Worthington. He stayed there for six years before moving to Queens Park Rangers in December 1974 for £100,000. Masson made his debut in the 1-0 home win versus Sheffield United on 14 December 1974.

Although approaching 29 years of age before he played top-level football, his was a signing that underlined the quality of then manager Dave Sexton's judgement. A stylish and creative midfielder, he came to be seen as the final piece in the jigsaw of an exciting and attacking QPR team. The following 1975/76 season saw QPR come close to winning the League title, being pipped by a point by Liverpool.

After three years at Loftus Road he moved to Derby County in October 1977 in exchange for Leighton James. After a further spell at Notts County he played for a time in the United States. Don was voted Notts best player of all time by Notts County supporters and also has a lounge at Meadow Lane named in his honour. On returning to England he became the player-manager of Kettering Town, before retiring from the game.

International career
Masson won 17 caps for Scotland. He scored five goals including Scotland’s first goal in the 2-1 victory over England in 1976 which clinched their first British Home International Championship since 1967. He missed a penalty kick in the 3–1 defeat against Peru in the 1978 World Cup.

Retirement
In retirement he turned his hand in to the hotel business, having bought The Gallery at Trent Bridge, Nottingham, which he later sold. He and his wife now run The Grange, a guest house in Elton on the Hill.

See also
List of Scotland national football team captains

References

External links

Best & Worst: Don Masson Sunday Times, 20 September 2009

1946 births
Living people
People from Banchory
Association football midfielders
Scottish footballers
Scottish expatriate footballers
Scotland international footballers
1978 FIFA World Cup players
Middlesbrough F.C. players
Notts County F.C. players
Queens Park Rangers F.C. players
Derby County F.C. players
Minnesota Kicks players
Bulova SA players
Kettering Town F.C. players
English Football League players
National League (English football) players
North American Soccer League (1968–1984) players
Scottish football managers
Kettering Town F.C. managers
Expatriate soccer players in the United States
Expatriate footballers in Hong Kong
Scottish expatriate sportspeople in the United States
Footballers from Aberdeenshire